Ani Adjimanova (born 8 August 1989) is a Macedonian footballer who plays as a midfielder for the North Macedonia national team.

International career
Adjimanova made her debut for the North Macedonia national team on 27 March 2010, against Norway.

References

1989 births
Living people
Women's association football midfielders
Macedonian women's footballers
North Macedonia women's international footballers